d-project is a Japanese cover band under the Giza Studio label. The band was formed to celebrate 25th anniversary of Zard's debut and in first album arranged popular songs. Famous arrangers and composed were grouped with guest vocalist Maki Ohguro and guest mc Ken. The first album d-project with ZARD was released on 30 May 2016. The album reached #33 rank first week and charted for 3 weeks.

Discography

d-project with ZARD
All songs are originally written by Izumi Sakai. Compositions for each song by individual composers remains same.

References

External links
Official website 

Japanese pop rock music groups
Being Inc. artists